Saad Nasser  (born 12 November 1973) is a former Iraqi football goalkeeper who played for Iraq in the 2002 WAFF Championship. He played for the national team between 1999 and 2004.

References

Iraqi footballers
Iraq international footballers
Living people
1973 births
Association football goalkeepers